Gordon Donald Fee (May 23, 1934 – October 25, 2022) was an American-Canadian Christian theologian who was an ordained minister of the Assemblies of God (USA).  He was professor of New Testament Studies at Regent College in Vancouver, British Columbia, Canada.

Biography
Fee was born in 1934 in Ashland, Oregon, to Donald Horace Fee (1907–1999) and Gracy Irene Jacobson (1906–1979). His father was an Assemblies of God minister who pastored several churches in Washington state. Fee received his BA and MA degrees from Seattle Pacific University and his PhD from the University of Southern California where he wrote his dissertation on the Papyrus 66. On April 21, 2010, Fee was awarded an honorary Doctor of Divinity degree from Northwest University in Kirkland, Washington, where Fee had taught in the past and where a building is named for his father, Donald Fee. After teaching briefly at Wheaton College in Illinois and for several years at Vanguard University of Southern California, Fee taught at Gordon-Conwell Theological Seminary in South Hamilton, Massachusetts, from fall 1974 until 1986. He then moved to Regent College where he was Professor of New Testament until his retirement in 2009.

Fee was considered a leading expert in pneumatology and textual criticism of the New Testament. He was also the author of books on biblical exegesis, including the popular introductory work How to Read the Bible for All Its Worth (co-authored with Douglas Stuart), the "sequel," How to Read the Bible, Book by Book, How to Choose a Translation for all its Worth (co-authored with Mark L. Strauss), and a major commentary on 1 Corinthians, as well as numerous other commentaries on various books in the New Testament. In the 1990s, he succeeded F.F. Bruce to become the editor of the notable evangelical commentary series, the New International Commentary on the New Testament of which his commentaries on 1 Corinthians and Philippians are a part.

Fee was a member of the CBT (Committee on Bible Translation) that translated the New International Version (NIV) and its revision, the Today's New International Version (TNIV). He also served on the advisory board of the International Institute for Christian Studies.

He discovered that Codex Sinaiticus in Gospel of John 1:1–8:38 and in some other parts of this Gospel does not represent the Alexandrian text-type but the Western text-type.

In 2012, Fee announced that he was retiring as general editor of the New International Commentary on the New Testament series due to the fact that he had been diagnosed with Alzheimer's disease. He died on October 25, 2022, at his home in New York City, aged 88.

Views

Christian egalitarianism
Fee was a Christian egalitarian and was a contributing editor to the key Christian egalitarian book Discovering Biblical Equality: Complementarity without hierarchy (2004). His above mentioned commentary consistently translates the generic "men" as "men and women" with an explanatory footnote. He was also a member of the board of reference for Christians for Biblical Equality, a group of Evangelical Christians who believe the Bible teaches complete equality between men and women and that all Christians, regardless of gender "must exercise their God-given gifts with equal authority and equal responsibility in church, home and world".

Pentecostal distinctives
Fee was a Pentecostal; nevertheless, he disagreed with some long held and deeply cherished Pentecostal beliefs. Specifically, he questioned article 7 of the Assemblies of God Statement of Fundamental Truths, which articulates a classical Pentecostal understanding of baptism in the Holy Spirit as subsequent to and separate from Christian conversion. In "Baptism in the Holy Spirit: The Issue of Separability and Subsequence", Fee writes that there is little biblical evidence to prove the traditional Pentecostal doctrinal position.

On the other hand, he maintained that "the Pentecostal experience itself can be defended on exegetical grounds as a thoroughly biblical phenomenon". Fee believed that in the early church, the Pentecostal experience was an expected part of conversion:

Fee believed the Spirit's empowerment is a necessary element in the life of the Church that has too often been neglected. It is this neglect, Fee argued, that led early Pentecostals to seek the presence and power of the Spirit in experiences which they identified as baptism in the Holy Spirit.

Opposition to prosperity theology
Fee was a strong opponent of the prosperity gospel and published a 1985 book entitled The Disease of the Health and Wealth Gospels.

Works

Books

As editor

Articles

References 

1934 births
2022 deaths
20th-century Canadian Protestant theologians
American emigrants to Canada
American Pentecostal pastors
Assemblies of God people
Bible commentators
Canadian Pentecostal pastors
Gordon–Conwell Theological Seminary faculty
New Testament scholars
Pentecostal theologians
Pentecostal writers
Academic staff of Regent College
Seattle Pacific University alumni
University of Southern California alumni
Wheaton College (Illinois) faculty
Writers from Ashland, Oregon